Season 1988–89 was the 105th football season in which Dumbarton competed at a Scottish national level, entering the Scottish Football League for the 83rd time, the Scottish Cup for the 94th time and the Scottish League Cup for the 42nd time.

Overview 
Dumbarton's descent into the lower reaches of league football continued with a 12th-place finish—just two away from the bottom—their worst performance for over 50 years.  The loss of Owen Coyle was a huge blow and with a change in manager and a sizeable turnover in playing staff, conditions were never going to be the best.

In the Scottish Cup, for the first time in many years, Dumbarton would start their campaign in the first round, and it would be two struggles to see off Highland League opposition, before Celtic were to prove too much in the third round.

In the League Cup, Premier Division St Mirren were to be the victors in the second round.

Locally, Dumbarton's grip on the Stirlingshire Cup was fairly easily released with a disappointing first round defeat by East Stirlingshire.

Finally, the friendly arranged with West Bromwich Albion was in celebration of the 'world championship' match between WBA and Renton in 1888, with Dumabrton winning the Renton Centenary Trophy after the 2-1 victory.

Results and fixtures

Scottish Second Division

Skol Cup

Scottish Cup

Stirlingshire Cup

Renton Centenary Cup

Pre-season and other matches

League table

Player statistics

Squad 

|}
Sources:

Transfers

Players in

Players out 

Source:

Reserve team
Dumbarton competed in the Scottish Reserve League (West), but withdrew after 18 games due to financial constraints.

Trivia
 The League match against East Fife on 19 November marked Stuart MacIver's 100th appearance for Dumbarton in all national competitions—the 97th Dumbarton player to reach this milestone.
 Despite the previous season's relegation, manager Bertie Auld retained his position.  However a poor start saw Auld replaced by Jim George seven games into the new season.

See also
 1988–89 in Scottish football

References

External links
Peter Wharton (Dumbarton Football Club Historical Archive)
Craig Douglas (Dumbarton Football Club Historical Archive)
Derek English (Dumbarton Football Club Historical Archive)
Dave Fulton (Dumbarton Football Club Historical Archive)
Ian McDougall (Dumbarton Football Club Historical Archive)
Iain McKinlay (Dumbarton Football Club Historical Archive)
George Elliott (Dumbarton Football Club Historical Archive)
Benny Rooney (Dumbarton Football Club Historical Archive)
Scottish Football Historical Archive

Dumbarton F.C. seasons
Scottish football clubs 1988–89 season